Protests against George W. Bush occurred throughout the United States and the world during his presidency.   

The protests had a significant impact on shaping public opinion and influencing his legacy. Anti-war rallies, environmental demonstrations, and civil rights marches were among the different types of protests that took place during the period from 2001 to 2009.These protests challenged Bush's foreign and domestic policies, particularly the wars in Afghanistan and Iraq, and the controversial use of torture and other tactics in the War on Terror.

2001

First inauguration 
Thousands of demonstrators attended the inaugural ceremonies in Washington, D.C., to protest the outcome and controversial circumstances of the 2000 U.S. Presidential Election.

2005 
 January 20, 2005 counter-inaugural protest

See also 
 Protests against the Iraq War (spanning most of George W. Bush's presidency)

References 

Presidency of George W. Bush
Protests against results of elections
Protests in the United States